Philip Ray Martinez (July 13, 1957 – February 26, 2021) was a United States district judge of the United States District Court for the Western District of Texas.

Education and career

Born in El Paso, Texas, Martinez received a Bachelor of Arts degree from the University of Texas at El Paso in 1979 and a Juris Doctor from Harvard Law School in 1982. He was in private practice in El Paso from 1982 to 1990. He was a judge on the County Court at Law #1, El Paso County from 1991 to 1994, and on the 327th Judicial District Court, Texas from 1991 to 2002.

District court service

On October 9, 2001, Martinez was nominated by President George W. Bush to a new seat on the United States District Court for the Western District of Texas created by 114 Stat. 2762. He was confirmed by the United States Senate on February 5, 2002, and received his commission on February 12, 2002. His service terminated on February 26, 2021, due to his death of an apparent heart attack.

See also
List of Hispanic/Latino American jurists

References

Sources

1957 births
2021 deaths
University of Texas at El Paso alumni
Harvard Law School alumni
Hispanic and Latino American judges
Judges of the United States District Court for the Western District of Texas
United States district court judges appointed by George W. Bush
21st-century American judges
People from El Paso, Texas
Texas state court judges